Kings Transit Authority is a public transit agency operating buses in the Annapolis Valley, Nova Scotia. The system, incorporated in 1981, is funded by Kings County, Annapolis County, Digby County and the towns of Berwick, Wolfville, Kentville, Middleton, Annapolis Royal, and Digby.

Kings Transit originally operated between Wolfville and Kentville, eventually expanding to Greenwood in western Kings County.

In 2000, the Municipality of the County of Annapolis funded the system's expansion to Bridgetown and eventually Annapolis Royal.  The Municipality of the District of Digby funded the expansion of Kings Transit west to Weymouth, serving Upper Clements Park, Cornwallis Park and Digby.  The Municipality of the District of West Hants funded the system's eastern expansion from Wolfville through Hantsport to Brooklyn.

Today the Kings Transit system consists of six routes, primarily travelling on Trunk 1 from Hantsport to Weymouth.

In October 2015, Kings Transit ended their Wolfville to Brooklyn route due to lack of funding from West Hants, and the towns of Hantsport and Windsor.

Fleet

Routes

Bus routes run every two hours, Bus fare cost per route is 3.50$ for Adults and Seniors and 1.75$ for children aged 5 to 11.

 Route 1 Wolfville to Greenwood 
Travels via Trunk 1 from Wolfville Town Centre, through the shopping center of the Annapolis Valley, 
New Minas, Downtown Kentville, the Kentville Industrial Park, the town of Berwick, and the Villages of Aylesford,  Kingston and Greenwood before stopping at Greenwood Mall.
 Route 1A Greenwood to Wolfville 
Travels Route 1 backwards, starting at Greenwood Mall and ending at Wolfville Town Centre.
 Route 2 Kentville to Hantsport 
Travels from Station Lane in Downtown Kentville, through North Kentville passing the NSCC Kingstec Campus and the Valley Regional Hospital, the Village of Port Williams, the town of Wolfville, the Historical site of Grand Pre and the farmlands of Avonport before stopping at Tannery Road in Hantsport.
 Route 2A Hantsport to Kentville 
Travels Route 2 backwards from Tannery Road in Hantsport to Station Lane in Kentville.
 Route 3 Bridgetown to Greenwood 
Travels via Trunk 1 from Post Office Street in Bridgetown through Lawrencetown passing the NSCC Centre of Geographic Sciences Campus, Middleton passing the NSCC Annapolis Campus, Soldiers Memorial Hospital, and the communities of Nictaux and Wilmot before turning down Highway 201 to Greenwood, eventually stopping at Greenwood Mall.
 Route 3A Greenwood to Bridgetown 
Travels Route 3 backwards from Greenwood Mall to Post Office Street in Bridgetown.
 Route 4 Bridgetown to Cornwallis 
Travels via Trunk 1 from Post Office Street in Bridgetown through the community of Granville, Downtown Annapolis Royal passing the Historic site of Fort Anne, Annapolis Community Health Centre and the communities of Clementsport and Cornwallis before stopping at Cornwallis Mall.
 Route 4A Cornwallis to Bridgetown 
Travels Route 4 backwards from Cornwallis Mall to Post Office Street in Bridgetown.
 Route 5 Cornwallis to Weymouth 
Travels via Trunk 1 and Highway 101 from Cornwallis Mall, through the community of Smith's Cove, the commercial district and downtown Digby, the communities of Barton and Gilbert's Cove before stopping at Foodland in Weymouth.
 Route 5A Weymouth to Cornwallis 
Travels Route 5 backwards from Foodland in Weymouth to Cornwallis Mall.
 Route 6 Greenwood to Wolfville  
Travels via Trunk 1 from Greenwood Mall, through the Villages of Greenwood, Kingston and Aylesford, the town of Berwick, the Kentville Industrial Park, Downtown and North Kentville passing NSCC Kingstec Campus and the Valley Regional Hospital, and the Annapolis Valley Shopping Centre, New Minas before stopping in Wolfville Town Centre. Route 6 runs the opposite hour of Route 1.
 Route 6A Wolfville to Greenwood 
Travels Route 6 backwards from Wolfville Town Centre, by-passing North Kentville, to the Greenwood Mall. Route 6 runs the opposite hour of Route 1.

References

External links
 Kings Transit official website

Transit agencies in Nova Scotia
Transport in Annapolis County, Nova Scotia
Transport in Digby County, Nova Scotia
Transport in Hants County, Nova Scotia
Transport in Kings County, Nova Scotia
Bus transport in Nova Scotia